Mighty Car Mods is a YouTube channel that focuses on DIY car modifications and car culture. Created by Blair Joscelyne (known as MOOG) and Martin Mulholland the show is centred around the journey through buying, modifying and then testing or battling cars of various levels of modification and budget.

While typically based in Sydney, Australia, Marty and MOOG have travelled extensively to experience car culture all over the world and create movies from these experiences. They have filmed in locations including Japan, Cuba, Germany, the UAE, America, Switzerland, the UK and New Zealand. They also host The Unicorn Circuit on their MCMtv2 YouTube channel, which keeps fans up to date with automotive news and includes fan submissions.

History
Mighty Car Mods debuted on YouTube in January 2008, with the first video ("How to pimp your car for $500") showing basic modifications and upgrades on MOOG's 2001 Daihatsu Cuore that were typical of the period. The long-time friends started making videos showing people how to work on cars at an amateur level as they are typical of many car enthusiasts who like the feeling of satisfaction from doing modifications but do not hold a trade qualification.

Marty actually works in the music/audio production industry and is a sound engineer by trade, while MOOG is a composer and music producer whose work can be heard in commercials for Telstra, Arnotts, Optus, Amex, Ford, BMW, Coles Supermarkets, Loveable Lingerie, IBM, L’Oreal, Heinz, OPSM, Subaru, Origin, Lexus, Jetstar, Touchstone Pictures, Visa Inc, Mazda, Cascade Brewery, Discovery Channel, Renault, Wrigley Company, and Village Cinemas. He has released a number of solo albums and he has been involved with a variety of different bands and musical projects.

In 2022, Mighty Car Mods opened a Collobarative workspace named 'Super Garage' in Sydney, Australia

Format

The general format for episodes involves buying different cars and modifying them in a particular style or for a particular purpose. Vehicles are typically from what is colloquially known as "late-model Japanese and European tuning" scene with cars ranging in age from the mid-1980s through the 2000s. However, MCM has also done builds on classic Australian cars (HQ Holden), as well as near-new Japanese (Subaru BRZ) and European (Audi RS3, VW Golf R, Lotus Exige S240) vehicles.

Episodes generally commence with a semi-animated introduction, created by Gavin Tyrell, followed by Marty and MOOG giving either an introduction to the project or a rundown of previous episode's highlights. Episodes vary in duration, from 15 to 60 minutes, but most will typically run about 20 minutes.

Sometimes Marty and MOOG will set a challenge to each buy a car with a particular constraint (budget or style of car), and build it independent of each other. The goal of these series is to then battle head-to-head in a series of challenges. Recently MCM has also participated in "Catch and Release" episodes where vehicles are brought in for only one or two episodes, then moved on. Other builds run for months due to the complexity and scale of the modifications being undertaken.

Typically, cars featured in builds will be given a name—often a pun such as Yaris Hilton or Taylor Drift—to build an identity with viewers. The show was originally filmed on Marty's mother's driveway and garage, but was moved to a private indoor location in Sydney in 2015, following issues with people posting spoilers or causing traffic issues in the suburban street.

The MCM duo have released several critically acclaimed feature-length films documenting automotive-focused travel, such as Turbos and Temples, Kei to the City, Chasing Midnight, and Turbos and TemplesII, and The Cars of Cuba. MCM are the first Australian-produced automotive show to be aired globally on Discovery Channel, and MCM also appears on Qantas in-flight entertainment.

All music used in the show and associated films is composed and produced by MOOG, with editing and uploading handled by both he and Marty. The mix of technical content with irreverent humor and high production quality has found a fanbase among a wide demographic of people. This has led to Mighty Car Mods videos being viewed more than 780 million times, making MCM one of the most successful shows of its type on YouTube.

Cast
Marty typically shows more hands-on mechanical experience in videos, while MOOG will often handle creative tasks involving design or aesthetics. Due to their background as amateur mechanics Marty and MOOG will sometimes enlist the help of industry-qualified experts for complex builds.

Special guests include Miles "Dose Vader" Stinton, Scott "Tuning Fork" Hilzinger, Benny "Mechanical Stig" Neal, and Alan "Turbo Yoda" Butler. Typically, these guests are known by their nicknames, with Turbo Yoda (with his offsider, Ben "Woody" Wood) now hosting The Skid Factory from his home in Queensland, while Mechanical Stig fronts the Benny's Custom Works channel. Tuning Fork works at Haltech, while Dose Vader runs AM Auto in Noosaville in Queensland.

Project cars
The year shown is when the project began.

Reception
Part of MCM's success stems from the hosts' relatability as everyman car enthusiast, as well as their humorous and laconic nature, and their desire to tackle complex tasks and learn new skills along the way. Their first feature-length film titled Turbos and Temples was well received by critics and motoring fans when it premiered at Hoyts Cinema, Fox Studios, in Sydney, Australia. So far their videos have garnered more than 780 million views on YouTube, with almost five billion impressions.

MCM used to publish a digital magazine, which is still available on their web store along with digital downloads of MOOG's music and show merchandise. In 2018, to celebrate their 10th anniversary, Mighty Car Mods released a limited-edition hardcover 128-page book titled The Cars of Mighty Car Mods, featuring illustrations of all the cars they worked on in their first 10 years. This was updated for 2019 with a further 30 cars added and The Cars of Mighty Car Mods: Modified Edition.

References

External links 
 
 

Automotive web series
Vehicle modification media
YouTube original programming